The 1994 NCAA Division I Cross Country Championships were the 56th annual NCAA Men's Division I Cross Country Championship and the 14th annual NCAA Women's Division I Cross Country Championship to determine the team and individual national champions of NCAA Division I men's and women's collegiate cross country running in the United States. In all, four different titles were contested: men's and women's individual and team championships.

Held on November 21, 1994, the combined meet was hosted by the University of Arkansas in Fayetteville, Arkansas. The distance for the men's race was 10 kilometers (6.21 miles) while the distance for the women's race was 5 kilometers (3.11 miles). 

The men's team championship was won by Iowa State, their second overall title and first since 1989. The women's team championship, however, was once again retained by Villanova, their sixth overall and fourth consecutive. 

The two individual champions were Martin Keino (Arizona, 30:08.7) and Jennifer Rhines (Villanova, 16:31.2).

Men's title
Distance: 10,000 meters

Men's Team Result (Top 10)

(H) – Host team

Men's Individual Result (Top 10)

Women's title
Distance: 5,000 meters

Women's Team Result (Top 10)

(H) – Host team

Women's Individual Result (Top 10)

References
 

NCAA Cross Country Championships
NCAA Division I Cross Country Championships
NCAA Division I Cross Country Championships
NCAA Division I Cross Country Championships
Track and field in Arkansas
Sports in Fayetteville, Arkansas
University of Arkansas